In mathematics, the Honda–Tate theorem classifies abelian varieties over finite fields up to isogeny. It states that the isogeny classes of simple abelian varieties over a finite field of order q correspond to algebraic integers all of whose conjugates (given by eigenvalues of the Frobenius endomorphism on the first cohomology group or Tate module) have absolute value .

 showed that the map taking an isogeny class to the eigenvalues of the Frobenius is injective, and  showed that this map is surjective, and therefore a bijection.

References

Theorems in algebraic geometry